Soteriology ("salvation" from σωτήρ  "savior, preserver" and λόγος  "study" or "word") is the study of religious doctrines of salvation. Salvation theory occupies a place of special significance in many religions. In the academic field of religious studies, soteriology is understood by scholars as representing a key theme in a number of different religions and is often studied in a comparative context; that is, comparing various ideas about what salvation is and how it is obtained.

Buddhism
Buddhism is devoted primarily to liberation from Duḥkha or suffering by breaking free of samsara, the cycle of compulsory rebirth, by attaining nirvana. Many types of Buddhism, Theravada, Mahayana and Vajrayana (or Tantric), emphasize an individual's meditation and subsequent liberation from samsara, which is to become enlightened.

However, the Pure Land traditions of Mahayana Buddhism generally focus on the saving nature of the Celestial Buddha Amitābha. In Mahayana Buddhist eschatology, it is believed that we are currently living in the Latter Day of the Law, a period of 10,000 years where the corrupt nature of the people means the teachings of the Buddha are not listened to. Before this era, the bodhisattva Amitābha made 48 vows, including the vow to accept all sentient beings that called to him, to allow them to take refuge in his Pure land and to teach them the pure dharma. It is therefore considered ineffective to trust in personal meditational and even monastic practices, but to only trust in the primal vow of Amitābha.

Christianity

In Christianity, salvation, also called "deliverance" or "redemption", is the saving of human beings from sin and its consequences. Variant views on salvation are among the main lines dividing the various Christian denominations, being a point of disagreement between Eastern Orthodoxy, Roman Catholicism and Protestantism, as well as within Protestantism, notably in the Calvinist–Arminian debate. These lines include conflicting definitions of depravity, predestination, atonement, and most pointedly, justification. Christian soteriology ranges from exclusive salvation to universal reconciliation concepts.

While some of the differences are as widespread as Christianity itself, the overwhelming majority agrees that salvation is made possible by the life, crucifixion, death, and resurrection of Jesus.

Hinduism

Soteriology is discussed in Hinduism through its principle of moksha, also called nirvana or kaivalya. "In India", wrote Mircea Eliade, "metaphysical knowledge always has a soteriological purpose." Moksha refers to freedom from saṃsāra, the cycle of death and rebirth. There are various principles and practices that can lead to the state of moksha including the Vedas and the Tantras being the basic scriptures for guidance along with many others like Upanishads, Puranas and more.

Islam

Muslims believe that everyone is responsible for their own actions. So even though Muslims believe that Adam and Hawwa (Eve), the parents of humanity, committed a sin by eating from the forbidden tree and thus disobeyed God, they believe that humankind is not responsible for such an action. They believe that God (Allah) is fair and just and one should request forgiveness from him to avoid being punished for not doing what God asked of them and for listening to Satan. Muslims believe that they, as well as everyone else, are vulnerable to making mistakes and thus they need to seek repentance repeatedly at all times.

Muhammad said, "By Allah, I seek the forgiveness of Allah and I turn to Him in repentance more than seventy times each day." (Narrated by al-Bukhaari, no. 6307) God wants his servants to repent and forgives them, he rejoices over it, as Muhammad said: "When a person repents, Allah rejoices more than one of you who found his camel after he lost it in the desert." (Agreed upon. Narrated by al-Bukhaari, no. 6309) Islamic tradition has generally held that it is relatively straightforward to enter Jannah (Paradise). In the Quran, God says: "If you avoid the great sins you have been forbidden, We shall wipe out your minor misdeeds and let you through the entrance of honor [Paradise]."

However, by direct implication of these tenets and beliefs, Man's nature is spiritually and morally flawed such that he needs salvation from himself. Finding appreciation, forgiveness, and joy in Allah is the only (or best) practice to be saved from this terrible fate of corruption and meaninglessness. al-Tahreem 66:8

Jainism

In Jainism, the soteriological concept is moksha, but it is explained differently than the similar term found in Hinduism. Moksha is a blissful state of existence of a soul, completely free from the karmic bondage, free from saṃsāra, the cycle of birth and death. It is the highest state of existence of a soul, even higher than the gods living in the heavens. In the state of moksha, a soul enjoys infinite bliss, infinite knowledge and infinite perception. This state is achieved through realisation of self and achieving a completely desireless and unattached state.

Judaism

In contemporary Judaism, redemption (Hebrew ge'ulah) is God's redeeming the people of Israel from their various exiles. This includes the final redemption from the present exile. Judaism holds that adherents do not need personal salvation, as Christians believe. Jews do not believe in original sin. Instead, they place a high value on individual morality as defined in the law of God—embodied in what Jews know as the Torah or The Law, given to Moses by God on Mount Sinai, the summary of which is comprised in the Ten Commandments. The Jewish sage Hillel the Elder states that The Law can be further compressed in just one line, popularly known as the Golden Rule: "That which is hateful to you, do not do unto your fellow".

In Judaism, salvation is closely related to the idea of redemption, saving from the states or circumstances that destroy the value of human existence. God, as the universal spirit and creator of the world, is the source of all salvation for humanity, provided an individual honors God by observing his precepts. So redemption or salvation depends on the individual. Judaism stresses that salvation cannot be obtained through anyone else or by just invoking a deity or believing in any outside power or influence.

Some passages in Jewish religious texts assert that no afterlife exists, even for the good and just, with the Book of Ecclesiastes telling the faithful: "The dead know nothing. They have no reward and even the memory of them is lost." For many centuries, rabbis and Jewish laypeople have often wrestled with such passages.

Mystery religions
In the mystery religions, salvation was less worldly and communal, and more a mystical belief concerned with the continued survival of the individual soul after death. Some savior gods associated with this theme are dying-and-rising gods, often associated with the seasonal cycle, such as Osiris, Tammus, Adonis, and Dionysus. A complex of soteriological beliefs was also a feature of the cult of Cybele and Attis.

The similarity of themes and archetypes to religions found in antiquity to later Christianity has been pointed out by many authors, including the Fathers of the early Christian church. One view is that early Christianity borrowed these myths and motifs from contemporary Hellenistic mystery religions, which possessed ideas such as life-death-rebirth deities and sexual relations between gods and human beings. While Christ myth theory is not accepted by mainstream historians, proponents attempt to establish causal connections to the cults of Mithras, Dionysus, and Osiris among others.

Epicurean philosophy
More than a century after the establishment of the Garden, the school in which Epicurus taught philosophy, some people in the Roman world were calling Epicurus their Savior. The most prominent soul saved by Epicurus was the Roman Empress Pompeia Plotina. Lucretius, author of De Rerum Natura, also depicts the salvific power of philosophy, and of his Scholarch Epicurus, by employing literary devices like the "Broken Jar parable" (where the Scholarch is credited with helping mortals to easily enjoy pleasure), poetry, and imagery.

The salvation of Epicurus has no otherworldly connotations whatsoever. Judging from his Principal Doctrines and Letter to Menoeceus, he salves his disciples from supernatural fears and excessive desires for what is not natural and gives his disciples clear ethical guidelines that lead to happiness. Lucretius says Epicurus has set the boundaries for the limits of nature. His followers in Roman times developed Epicurus into a cultural hero and revered him as the founding figure of his School, and as the first to have developed a fully naturalistic cosmology that emancipated mortals from all fear-based superstition.

Sikhism
Sikhism advocates the pursuit of salvation through disciplined, personal meditation on the Naam Japo (name) and message of God, meant to bring one into union with God. But a person's state of mind has to be detached from this world, with the understanding that this world is a temporary abode and their soul has to remain untouched by pain, pleasure, greed, emotional attachment, praise, slander, and above all, egotistical pride. Thus their thoughts and deeds become nirmal or pure, and they merge with God or attain union with God, just as a drop of water falling from the skies merges with the ocean.

Other religions
Shinto and Tenrikyo similarly emphasize working for a good life by cultivating virtue or virtuous behavior.

In an age that still saw salvation as primarily collective - based on the religion of the family, clan, or state - rather than the emerging province of the individual (as popularized by Buddhism and the mystery religions such as Mithraism) and Hellenistic ruler cults from about 300 BCE sometimes promoted the revering of a king as the savior of his people. Prominent examples included Ptolemy I Soter of Egypt and the Seleucids Antiochus I Soter and Demetrius I Soter. In the Egyptian context, the deification of a ruler was built on traditional pharaonic religious ideas.

See also

 Comparative religion
 Salvation

References

Further reading
 John McIntyre, Shape of Soteriology: Studies in the Doctrine of the Death of Christ, T&T Clark, 1992.
 

Theology
Salvation